Suddala (సుద్దాల) is one of the Indian surnames:

 Suddala Hanmanthu, is a lyrical writer.
 Suddala Ashok Teja, is a popular lyric writer in Tollywood.

Surnames of Indian origin